Oulton Dyke is a freshwater stretch of water in the Norfolk Broads, located in Suffolk within the United Kingdom. The dyke connects Oulton Broad near Lowestoft to the River Waveney by means of a confluence near the village of Burgh St Peter.

Oulton Dyke is approximately one mile long, and from Oulton Broad heads west then after some 400 yards makes a sharp turn to the north to join with the River Waveney. The name Oulton Dyke however is rarely used, because there are many misconceptions that it is part the River Waveney.

Rivers of Suffolk